Ptolederma was a town of ancient Arcadia, Greece, in the region of Eutresia. It was deserted in consequence of the removal of its inhabitants to Megalopolis. Its site is unlocated.

References

Populated places in ancient Arcadia
Former populated places in Greece
Lost ancient cities and towns